Richard P. Hallion is Senior Adviser for Air and Space Issues, Directorate for Security, Counterintelligence and Special Programs Oversight, the Pentagon, Washington, D.C. He is responsible for analysis and insight regarding the conceptualization, evolution and utilization of sensitive national technological programs and related subject areas.

Hallion graduated from the University of Maryland in 1970. He has experience in science and technology museum development, research and management analysis, and has served as a consultant to various professional organizations. He has flown as a mission observer in a range of military and civilian fixed and rotary-wing aircraft. Hallion is the author and editor of various books relating to aerospace technology and military operations, as well as articles and essays for a variety of professional journals. He also teaches and lectures widely.

Education
1970 Bachelor of Arts degree, high honors, University of Maryland, College Park
1975 Doctor of Philosophy degree, University of Maryland, College Park
1992 Federal Executive Institute, Charlottesville, Va.
1993 National Security Studies Program, John F. Kennedy School of Government, Harvard University, Cambridge, Mass.

Career Chronology
November 1974 - May 1980, Curator of Science and Technology, and Curator of Space Science and Exploration, National Air and Space Museum, Smithsonian Institution, Washington, D.C.
 May 1980 - January 1982, adjunct professor, University of Maryland, College Park
 January 1982 - May 1986, Chief Historian, Air Force Flight Test Center, Edwards Air Force Base, Calif.
 May 1986 - August 1987, Director, Special Staff Office, Aeronautical Systems Division, Wright-Patterson AFB, Ohio
 August 1987 - October 1988, Harold Keith Johnson Visiting Professor of Military History, Army War College, Carlisle Barracks, Pa.
 October 1988 - September 1990, Executive Historian, Directorate of Advanced Programs, Headquarters Air Force Systems Command, Andrews AFB, Md.
 September 1990 - May 1991, Charles A. Lindbergh Visiting Professor of Aerospace History, National Air and Space Museum, Smithsonian Institution, Washington, D.C.
 June 1991 - November 1991, senior issues and policy analyst, Secretary's Staff Group, Office of the Secretary of the Air Force, Washington, D.C.
 November 1991 - November 2002, the Air Force Historian, Bolling AFB, Washington, D.C.
 November 2002 - October 2003, Technical Adviser for Air Force Historic Events, Air Force Centennial of Flight Office, the Pentagon, Washington, D.C.
 October 2003 – present, Senior Adviser for Air and Space Issues, Directorate for Security, Counterintelligence and Special Programs Oversight, the Pentagon, Washington, D.C.

Awards and honors
1982 - 1983 AIAA Distinguished Lecturer
1984, 1985 Lt. Col. Roy Mase Trophy, Air Force Systems Command
1984, 1985 Commander's Distinguished Paper Award, Air Force Systems Command
1985 Citation of Honor, Air Force Association
1986 Meritorious Civilian Service Medal, U.S. Air Force
1988 Commander's Award for Public Service, U.S. Army
1990 Ira Eaker Award, Air University
1993 Aviation Space Writers Association Premier Award for defense aviation coverage
2000 Friend of the Society of Experimental Test Pilots
2004 Inaugural Fellow, Earthshine Institute of the Charles and Anne Morrow Lindbergh Foundation
2005 Associate Fellow, American Institute of Aeronautics and Astronautics
2005 Distinguished Lecturer, American Institute of Aeronautics and Astronautics
2005 Annual Award of the Conference of Historic Aviation Writers
2007 A. Verville Smithsonian Fellowship

Professional Memberships and Associations
National Defense Industrial Association
American Institute of Aeronautics and Astronautics
Royal United Services Institute for Defence and Security Studies
Air Force Association
Military Operations Research Society
Precision Strike Association
National Association of Scholars
Exchange Club of Capitol Hill

Publications

As author

As editor

References

External links

Air Force Link Hallion Biography
The Help Pilots Need from The Washington Post, October 8, 2007, retrieved January 4, 2008

American military writers
University of Maryland, College Park alumni
Harvard Kennedy School alumni
Living people
National Association of Scholars
Year of birth missing (living people)